The 2003–04 St. Louis Blues season was the 37th for the franchise in St. Louis, Missouri.  The Blues qualified for the Stanley Cup playoffs for the 25th straight seasons, the team's final playoff appearance until 2009. After finishing the regular season with a record of 39 wins, 30 losses, 11 ties and two overtime losses, the Blues were eliminated in the Western Conference Quarterfinals in five games by the San Jose Sharks.

Off-season
Chris Pronger resigned the team captaincy in favor of veteran defenseman Al MacInnis.

Regular season
On February 24, 2004, head coach Joel Quenneville was fired and replaced by assistant coach Mike Kitchen.

Final standings

Schedule and results

Regular season

|- align="center" bgcolor="#FF6F6F"
|1||OTL||October 10, 2003||1–2 OT|| align="left"| @ Phoenix Coyotes (2003–04) ||0–0–0–1 || 
|- align="center" bgcolor="#CCFFCC" 
|2||W||October 12, 2003||2–1 || align="left"| @ Colorado Avalanche (2003–04) ||1–0–0–1 || 
|- align="center" bgcolor="#FFBBBB"
|3||L||October 16, 2003||1–4 || align="left"| @ Nashville Predators (2003–04) ||1–1–0–1 || 
|- align="center" bgcolor="#CCFFCC" 
|4||W||October 18, 2003||4–1 || align="left"|  Washington Capitals (2003–04) ||2–1–0–1 || 
|- align="center" bgcolor="#CCFFCC" 
|5||W||October 21, 2003||6–4 || align="left"| @ Edmonton Oilers (2003–04) ||3–1–0–1 || 
|- align="center" bgcolor="#FFBBBB"
|6||L||October 22, 2003||2–3 || align="left"| @ Vancouver Canucks (2003–04) ||3–2–0–1 || 
|- align="center" bgcolor="#CCFFCC" 
|7||W||October 24, 2003||2–1 || align="left"| @ Calgary Flames (2003–04) ||4–2–0–1 || 
|- align="center" bgcolor="#CCFFCC" 
|8||W||October 28, 2003||1–0 || align="left"|  Nashville Predators (2003–04) ||5–2–0–1 || 
|- align="center" bgcolor="#CCFFCC" 
|9||W||October 29, 2003||6–5 || align="left"| @ Detroit Red Wings (2003–04) ||6–2–0–1 || 
|-

|- align="center" bgcolor="#FFBBBB"
|10||L||November 1, 2003||2–3 || align="left"|  Chicago Blackhawks (2003–04) ||6–3–0–1 || 
|- align="center" bgcolor="#CCFFCC" 
|11||W||November 4, 2003||2–1 OT|| align="left"|  Mighty Ducks of Anaheim (2003–04) ||7–3–0–1 || 
|- align="center" bgcolor="#CCFFCC" 
|12||W||November 6, 2003||3–2 || align="left"|  Vancouver Canucks (2003–04) ||8–3–0–1 || 
|- align="center" bgcolor="#CCFFCC" 
|13||W||November 8, 2003||2–0 || align="left"|  Florida Panthers (2003–04) ||9–3–0–1 || 
|- align="center" bgcolor="#CCFFCC" 
|14||W||November 13, 2003||4–3 OT|| align="left"| @ San Jose Sharks (2003–04) ||10–3–0–1 || 
|- align="center" bgcolor="#CCFFCC" 
|15||W||November 15, 2003||1–0 || align="left"| @ Los Angeles Kings (2003–04) ||11–3–0–1 || 
|- align="center" bgcolor="#FFBBBB"
|16||L||November 16, 2003||3–4 || align="left"| @ Mighty Ducks of Anaheim (2003–04) ||11–4–0–1 || 
|- align="center" bgcolor="#FFBBBB"
|17||L||November 19, 2003||4–5 || align="left"| @ Phoenix Coyotes (2003–04) ||11–5–0–1 || 
|- align="center" bgcolor="#CCFFCC" 
|18||W||November 22, 2003||2–1 || align="left"|  Dallas Stars (2003–04) ||12–5–0–1 || 
|- align="center" bgcolor="#CCFFCC" 
|19||W||November 25, 2003||4–3 OT|| align="left"|  Boston Bruins (2003–04) ||13–5–0–1 || 
|- align="center" 
|20||T||November 28, 2003||2–2 OT|| align="left"| @ Tampa Bay Lightning (2003–04) ||13–5–1–1 || 
|- align="center" bgcolor="#FFBBBB"
|21||L||November 29, 2003||1–2 || align="left"|  Detroit Red Wings (2003–04) ||13–6–1–1 || 
|-

|- align="center" bgcolor="#CCFFCC" 
|22||W||December 2, 2003||4–1 || align="left"|  Los Angeles Kings (2003–04) ||14–6–1–1 || 
|- align="center" 
|23||T||December 4, 2003||4–4 OT|| align="left"|  Detroit Red Wings (2003–04) ||14–6–2–1 || 
|- align="center" bgcolor="#CCFFCC" 
|24||W||December 6, 2003||4–1 || align="left"|  Nashville Predators (2003–04) ||15–6–2–1 || 
|- align="center" bgcolor="#CCFFCC" 
|25||W||December 9, 2003||3–2 OT|| align="left"| @ Toronto Maple Leafs (2003–04) ||16–6–2–1 || 
|- align="center" bgcolor="#CCFFCC" 
|26||W||December 12, 2003||3–2 OT|| align="left"| @ Columbus Blue Jackets (2003–04) ||17–6–2–1 || 
|- align="center" bgcolor="#CCFFCC" 
|27||W||December 13, 2003||2–1 || align="left"|  Los Angeles Kings (2003–04) ||18–6–2–1 || 
|- align="center" bgcolor="#CCFFCC" 
|28||W||December 16, 2003||2–1 OT|| align="left"|  Columbus Blue Jackets (2003–04) ||19–6–2–1 || 
|- align="center" bgcolor="#CCFFCC" 
|29||W||December 18, 2003||4–2 || align="left"|  San Jose Sharks (2003–04) ||20–6–2–1 || 
|- align="center" 
|30||T||December 20, 2003||1–1 OT|| align="left"|  Phoenix Coyotes (2003–04) ||20–6–3–1 || 
|- align="center" bgcolor="#FFBBBB"
|31||L||December 22, 2003||1–2 || align="left"| @ Detroit Red Wings (2003–04) ||20–7–3–1 || 
|- align="center" bgcolor="#FFBBBB"
|32||L||December 23, 2003||0–3 || align="left"| @ Chicago Blackhawks (2003–04) ||20–8–3–1 || 
|- align="center" 
|33||T||December 26, 2003||3–3 OT|| align="left"|  Colorado Avalanche (2003–04) ||20–8–4–1 || 
|- align="center" bgcolor="#CCFFCC" 
|34||W||December 29, 2003||3–2 || align="left"| @ Columbus Blue Jackets (2003–04) ||21–8–4–1 || 
|- align="center" bgcolor="#FFBBBB"
|35||L||December 30, 2003||2–7 || align="left"|  Philadelphia Flyers (2003–04) ||21–9–4–1 || 
|-

|- align="center" bgcolor="#CCFFCC" 
|36||W||January 1, 2004||5–4 || align="left"|  New York Rangers (2003–04) ||22–9–4–1 || 
|- align="center" bgcolor="#FFBBBB"
|37||L||January 3, 2004||1–3 || align="left"|  San Jose Sharks (2003–04) ||22–10–4–1 || 
|- align="center" 
|38||T||January 5, 2004||1–1 OT|| align="left"|  Minnesota Wild (2003–04) ||22–10–5–1 || 
|- align="center" bgcolor="#FFBBBB"
|39||L||January 6, 2004||0–2 || align="left"| @ Carolina Hurricanes (2003–04) ||22–11–5–1 || 
|- align="center" bgcolor="#FFBBBB"
|40||L||January 10, 2004||1–3 || align="left"| @ Nashville Predators (2003–04) ||22–12–5–1 || 
|- align="center" bgcolor="#CCFFCC" 
|41||W||January 12, 2004||7–4 || align="left"|  Chicago Blackhawks (2003–04) ||23–12–5–1 || 
|- align="center" bgcolor="#FFBBBB"
|42||L||January 13, 2004||2–5 || align="left"| @ Montreal Canadiens (2003–04) ||23–13–5–1 || 
|- align="center" bgcolor="#CCFFCC" 
|43||W||January 15, 2004||5–3 || align="left"|  Columbus Blue Jackets (2003–04) ||24–13–5–1 || 
|- align="center" 
|44||T||January 17, 2004||2–2 OT|| align="left"|  Minnesota Wild (2003–04) ||24–13–6–1 || 
|- align="center" bgcolor="#CCFFCC" 
|45||W||January 19, 2004||2–1 OT|| align="left"| @ Florida Panthers (2003–04) ||25–13–6–1 || 
|- align="center" bgcolor="#FFBBBB"
|46||L||January 21, 2004||1–3 || align="left"| @ Columbus Blue Jackets (2003–04) ||25–14–6–1 || 
|- align="center" bgcolor="#FFBBBB"
|47||L||January 23, 2004||0–2 || align="left"| @ Dallas Stars (2003–04) ||25–15–6–1 || 
|- align="center" bgcolor="#FFBBBB"
|48||L||January 24, 2004||2–3 || align="left"|  Dallas Stars (2003–04) ||25–16–6–1 || 
|- align="center" 
|49||T||January 28, 2004||1–1 OT|| align="left"| @ Atlanta Thrashers (2003–04) ||25–16–7–1 || 
|- align="center" bgcolor="#FFBBBB"
|50||L||January 29, 2004||2–4 || align="left"|  Vancouver Canucks (2003–04) ||25–17–7–1 || 
|- align="center" bgcolor="#FFBBBB"
|51||L||January 31, 2004||1–4 || align="left"|  New Jersey Devils (2003–04) ||25–18–7–1 || 
|-

|- align="center" bgcolor="#FFBBBB"
|52||L||February 2, 2004||0–4 || align="left"| @ Minnesota Wild (2003–04) ||25–19–7–1 || 
|- align="center" bgcolor="#FFBBBB"
|53||L||February 4, 2004||3–5 || align="left"| @ Edmonton Oilers (2003–04) ||25–20–7–1 || 
|- align="center" bgcolor="#CCFFCC" 
|54||W||February 5, 2004||2–1 || align="left"| @ Calgary Flames (2003–04) ||26–20–7–1 || 
|- align="center" bgcolor="#FFBBBB"
|55||L||February 10, 2004||1–3 || align="left"| @ Ottawa Senators (2003–04) ||26–21–7–1 || 
|- align="center" bgcolor="#FFBBBB"
|56||L||February 12, 2004||0–4 || align="left"|  Colorado Avalanche (2003–04) ||26–22–7–1 || 
|- align="center" bgcolor="#CCFFCC" 
|57||W||February 14, 2004||3–2 OT|| align="left"|  Pittsburgh Penguins (2003–04) ||27–22–7–1 || 
|- align="center" bgcolor="#CCFFCC" 
|58||W||February 16, 2004||4–2 || align="left"|  Phoenix Coyotes (2003–04) ||28–22–7–1 || 
|- align="center" bgcolor="#CCFFCC" 
|59||W||February 19, 2004||4–3 OT|| align="left"|  Tampa Bay Lightning (2003–04) ||29–22–7–1 || 
|- align="center" bgcolor="#FFBBBB"
|60||L||February 20, 2004||1–5 || align="left"| @ Detroit Red Wings (2003–04) ||29–23–7–1 || 
|- align="center" bgcolor="#FF6F6F"
|61||OTL||February 22, 2004||2–3 OT|| align="left"| @ Chicago Blackhawks (2003–04) ||29–23–7–2 || 
|- align="center" 
|62||T||February 26, 2004||2–2 OT|| align="left"| @ Colorado Avalanche (2003–04) ||29–23–8–2 || 
|- align="center" bgcolor="#FFBBBB"
|63||L||February 28, 2004||0–2 || align="left"| @ Vancouver Canucks (2003–04) ||29–24–8–2 || 
|- align="center" bgcolor="#FFBBBB"
|64||L||February 29, 2004||0–1 || align="left"| @ San Jose Sharks (2003–04) ||29–25–8–2 || 
|-

|- align="center" bgcolor="#FFBBBB"
|65||L||March 2, 2004||2–4 || align="left"|  Calgary Flames (2003–04) ||29–26–8–2 || 
|- align="center" 
|66||T||March 4, 2004||1–1 OT|| align="left"|  Edmonton Oilers (2003–04) ||29–26–9–2 || 
|- align="center" bgcolor="#CCFFCC" 
|67||W||March 6, 2004||4–2 || align="left"| @ New York Islanders (2003–04) ||30–26–9–2 || 
|- align="center" bgcolor="#CCFFCC" 
|68||W||March 7, 2004||5–1 || align="left"| @ Buffalo Sabres (2003–04) ||31–26–9–2 || 
|- align="center" bgcolor="#CCFFCC" 
|69||W||March 9, 2004||3–2 OT|| align="left"|  New York Islanders (2003–04) ||32–26–9–2 || 
|- align="center" 
|70||T||March 11, 2004||1–1 OT|| align="left"|  Nashville Predators (2003–04) ||32–26–10–2 || 
|- align="center" bgcolor="#CCFFCC" 
|71||W||March 13, 2004||5–3 || align="left"|  Columbus Blue Jackets (2003–04) ||33–26–10–2 || 
|- align="center" bgcolor="#FFBBBB"
|72||L||March 14, 2004||0–3 || align="left"|  Calgary Flames (2003–04) ||33–27–10–2 || 
|- align="center" bgcolor="#CCFFCC" 
|73||W||March 16, 2004||5–3 || align="left"| @ Los Angeles Kings (2003–04) ||34–27–10–2 || 
|- align="center" 
|74||T||March 17, 2004||1–1 OT|| align="left"| @ Mighty Ducks of Anaheim (2003–04) ||34–27–11–2 || 
|- align="center" bgcolor="#FFBBBB"
|75||L||March 20, 2004||1–3 || align="left"| @ Dallas Stars (2003–04) ||34–28–11–2 || 
|- align="center" bgcolor="#CCFFCC" 
|76||W||March 25, 2004||3–2 || align="left"|  Mighty Ducks of Anaheim (2003–04) ||35–28–11–2 || 
|- align="center" bgcolor="#CCFFCC" 
|77||W||March 27, 2004||4–3 OT|| align="left"|  Chicago Blackhawks (2003–04) ||36–28–11–2 || 
|- align="center" bgcolor="#CCFFCC" 
|78||W||March 28, 2004||3–1 || align="left"| @ Chicago Blackhawks (2003–04) ||37–28–11–2 || 
|- align="center" bgcolor="#CCFFCC" 
|79||W||March 30, 2004||1–0 || align="left"|  Edmonton Oilers (2003–04) ||38–28–11–2 || 
|-

|- align="center" bgcolor="#FFBBBB"
|80||L||April 1, 2004||2–3 || align="left"|  Detroit Red Wings (2003–04) ||38–29–11–2 || 
|- align="center" bgcolor="#CCFFCC" 
|81||W||April 3, 2004||4–1 || align="left"| @ Nashville Predators (2003–04) ||39–29–11–2 || 
|- align="center" bgcolor="#FFBBBB"
|82||L||April 4, 2004||0–3 || align="left"| @ Minnesota Wild (2003–04) ||39–30–11–2 || 
|-

|-
| Legend:

Playoffs

|- align="center" bgcolor="#ffbbbb"
| 1 || April 8 || St. Louis || 0–1 || San Jose || OT || Osgood || 17,496 || Sharks lead 1–0 || 
|- align="center" bgcolor="#ffbbbb"
| 2 || April 10 || St. Louis || 1–3 || San Jose ||  || Osgood || 17,496 || Sharks lead 2–0 || 
|- align="center" bgcolor="#ccffcc" 
| 3 || April 12 || San Jose || 1–4 || St. Louis ||  || Osgood || 19,023 || Sharks lead 2–1 || 
|- align="center" bgcolor="#ffbbbb"
| 4 || April 13 || San Jose || 4–3 || St. Louis ||  || Osgood || 19,452 || Sharks lead 3–1 || 
|- align="center" bgcolor="#ffbbbb"
| 5 || April 15 || St. Louis || 1–3 || San Jose ||  || Osgood || 17,496 || Sharks win 4–1 || 
|-

|-
| Legend:

Player statistics

Scoring
 Position abbreviations: C = Center; D = Defense; G = Goaltender; LW = Left Wing; RW = Right Wing
  = Joined team via a transaction (e.g., trade, waivers, signing) during the season. Stats reflect time with the Blues only.
  = Left team via a transaction (e.g., trade, waivers, release) during the season. Stats reflect time with the Blues only.

Goaltending
  = Left team via a transaction (e.g., trade, waivers, release) during the season. Stats reflect time with the Blues only.

Awards and records

Awards

Milestones

Transactions
The Blues were involved in the following transactions from June 10, 2003, the day after the deciding game of the 2003 Stanley Cup Finals, through June 7, 2004, the day of the deciding game of the 2004 Stanley Cup Finals.

Trades

Players acquired

Players lost

Signings

Draft picks
St. Louis's draft picks at the 2003 NHL Entry Draft held at the Gaylord Entertainment Center in Nashville, Tennessee.

See also
2003–04 NHL season

Notes

References

 
 

St. Louis
St. Louis
St. Louis Blues seasons
St
St